Pulau Duyong (Duyong Island) is a river island in the mouth of Terengganu River in the state of Terengganu, Malaysia.

Etymology
The former name of this river island was Pulau Peria, peria being the Malay word that means 'bittergourd', alluding to the shape of the island. The name was changed to Duyong, a Malay word that means 'mermaid', after the residents of the island were allegedly reported to see two mermaids landing on its shore.

Geography

Pulau Duyong is located in Kuala Terengganu, and was previously divided into Pulau Duyong Besar and the smaller Pulau Duyong Kecil dan Pulau Ketam. Nevertheless, sedimentation and reclamation have united it as well as changed its coastline substantially. The area of the island now is 2.7 square kilometers. A seaward extension has been developed into the Heritage Bay Resort (now Duyong Marina & Resort) which previously hosted the annual Monsoon Cup yacht race. This island is connected to Kuala Terengganu and Kuala Nerus via Sultan Mahmud Bridge.

Culture
Pulau Duyong used to be the residence of scholar Tok Syeikh Duyong (1802–1889), who was respected by the palace as well as the people, and his descendants, and was a seat of religious learning. The Kota Lama Duyong (Duyong Old Fort)  is a remnant of his era. Duyong Old Fort is an old Malay palace featuring a unique architecture influenced by Western and Egyptian Islamic elements. Due to its geographical shape and the locational significance in terms of religious scholarship, Pulau Duyong has been referred to as the tongue of Terengganu.

Duyong Island is also known for its traditional boatmaking and boat repairing industry, which has existed since before independence. These traditional boats are made without the use of nails. In its heyday, the boatmakers of Duyong Island received orders from a number of countries, although this industry is now declining.

See also
 List of islands of Malaysia

References

Islands of Terengganu
River islands of Asia